Platymantis taylori is a species of frogs in the family Ceratobatrachidae. It is endemic to the Philippines and is known from the Sierra Madre of northeastern Luzon.

Etymology
The specific name taylori honors Edward Harrison Taylor (1889–1978), an American herpetologist.

Habitat and conservation
Its natural habitats are lower montane and lowland forests where it lives in the forest floor stratum. It breeds and makes its nest in leaf-litter. It is threatened by habitat loss caused by agriculture and logging.

References

taylori
Endemic fauna of the Philippines
Amphibians of the Philippines
Amphibians described in 1999
Taxonomy articles created by Polbot